Etzer Vilaire (7 April 1872 - 1951) was a Haitian poet and attorney.

Early life and education
Born in Jérémie, Vilaire was educated in private schools. He attended law school and passed the bar.

Career
Entering a law practice, he wrote poetry in his spare time but it was his true vocation.

He was a member of the literary society La Ronde.

Literary career
He published several books of poetry. His most remembered works are Page d'Amour (1897), Dix Hommes Noirs (1901), Années Tendres (1907), and Nouveaux Poèmes (1910).

References
 

1872 births
1951 deaths
Haitian male poets
People from Grand'Anse (department)
20th-century Haitian lawyers
19th-century Haitian lawyers
19th-century Haitian poets
19th-century male writers
20th-century Haitian poets
20th-century male writers